Karl Albert Buehr (1866–1952) was a painter born in Germany.

Buehr was born in Feuerbach - near Stuttgart. He was the son of Frederick Buehr and Henrietta Doh (Dohna?).  He moved to Chicago with his parents and siblings in the 1880s.   In Chicago, young Karl worked at various jobs until  he was employed by a lithograph company near the Art Institute of Chicago. Introduced to art at work, Karl paid regular visits to the Art Institute, where he found part-time employment, enabling him to enroll in night classes. Later, working at the Institute as a night watchman, he had a unique opportunity to study the masters and actually posted sketchings that blended in favorably with student's work. Having studied under John H. Vanderpoel, Buehr graduated with honors, while his work aroused such admiration that he was offered a teaching post there, which he maintained for many years thereafter. He graduated from the Art Inst. of Chicago and served in the IL Cav in the Spanish–American War. Mary Hess became Karl's wife—she was a student of his and an accomplished artist in her own right. In 1922, he was elected into the National Academy of Design as an Associate member.

Art Studies in Europe
In 1904, Buehr received a bronze medal at the St. Louis Universal Exposition, then, in 1905, Buehr and his family moved to France, thanks to a wealthy Chicago patron, and they spent the following year in Taormina, Sicily, where the artist painted local subjects, executing both genre subjects and landscapes as well as time in Venice. Buehr spent at least some time in Paris, where he worked with Raphaël Collin at the Académie Julian.

Giverny and American Impressionism
Prior to this time, Buehr had developed a quasi-impressionistic style, but after 1909, when he began spending summers near Monet in Giverny, his work became decidedly characteristic of that plein-air style but he began focusing on female subjects posed out-of-doors. He remained for some time in Giverny, and here he became well-acquainted with other well known expatriate America impressionists such as Richard Miller, Theodore Earl Butler, Frederick Frieseke, and Lawton Parker. It seems likely that Buehr met Monet, since his own daughter Kathleen and Monet’s granddaughter, Lili Butler, were playmates, according to George Buehr, the painter’s son. His other daughter Lydia died before adulthood due to diabetes. He returned to Chicago at the onset of World War I and taught at The Art Inst for many years. One of his noted pupils at the Art Institute was Archibald Motley, Jr. the famous African  American "Harlem" Renaissance painters. Motley credits Buehr with being one of his finest teachers and one who encouraged his style.

Teaching Career in Chicago
Buehr remained an expressive colorist, but broadened his brushwork somewhat in later years when impressionism waned. Back in America, he was immediately successful. He won a silver medal at the Panama-Pacific International Exposition in San Francisco and the Purchase Prize of the Chicago Municipal Art Commission in the following year. So famed was Buehr that had a one-man exhibition at the Century of Progress Fair in Chicago in 1934.

After a long and exceedingly productive career, Karl Buehr died in Chicago at the age of eighty-six.

Walter Buehr
His nephew Walter Buehr was the author and illustrator of many children's books.  Walter Franklin Buehr May 14, 1897 - January 2, 1971
Walter Buehr was born in Chicago on May 14, 1897. After high school he attended several different art schools including the Art Students League of New York (where he later taught), the Detroit School of Design, the Philadelphia School of Industrial Arts, the Art Students League, and he also studied art in Europe.
He began a first sergeant in the first camouflage section of the U.S. Army Engineers during World War I and was awarded the active service medal.
He married Camilla Goodwyn, a portrait artist and fashion illustrator, in 1938. The two had three daughters, and at least five grandchildren. Two of his grandchildren lived in France & couldn't speak English, which made it very hard on a grandfather who spoke very little French!
Buehr had varied talents and interests. He designed furniture, was interested in ceramics, like to tinker with high fidelity systems, and loved sailing. He even lived on his boat during the summers and cruised both the Atlantic coast and the Mediterranean. This hobby led to the writing of his first book - Ships and Life Afloat. He wanted children in the Midwest to be able to understand the terms used in stories about the sea, how the ships were rigged, how they operated, what the life of a sailor was like, etc.
His over fifty-six books, including four for adults, reflect his wide variety of interests, including sailing and the sea, medieval history, exploration, transportation, electricity, and more. His history books dealt with romantic eras full of knights, castles, galleys, and galleons. (This should be moved to its own entry if he is notable enough.)

Notable Works include but are not limited to:
1812: The War and the World, 1967 - TruthQuest 
Automobiles, Past and Present, 1968 
Birth of a Liner, 1961 
Bread, the Staff of Life, 1959 
Cargoes in the Sky, 1958 
Chivalry and the Mailed Knight, 1963 - TruthQuest 
Cloth, from Fiber to Fabric, 1965 
The Crusades, 1959 - TruthQuest 
Famous Small Boat Voyages, 1967 
Firearms, 1967 
First Book of Machines, 1962 
Food, From Farm to Home, 1970 
Freight Trains of the Sky, 1969 
French Explorers in America, 1961 - TruthQuest 
Galleys and Galleons, 1964 - TruthQuest 
Genie and the Word: Electricity and Communication, 1959 
Harbors and Cargoes, 1955 
Harvest of the Sea, 1955 - TruthQuest 
Heraldry: The Story of Armorial Bearing, 1964 - TruthQuest 
Home Sweet Home in the Nineteenth Century, 1965 
Keeping Time, 1960 
Knights and Castles and Feudal Life, 1957 - TruthQuest 
Magic of Paper, 1966 
Marvel of Glass, 1963 
Meat, From Ranch to Table, 1956 
Oil, Today’s Black Magic, 1957 
Plastics, The Man-made Miracle, 1967 
The Portuguese Explorers, 1966 - TruthQuest 
Railroads, Today and Yesterday, 1958 
Rubber, Natural and Synthetic, 1964 
Salt, Sugar, and Spice, 1969 
Sea Monsters, 1966 
Sending the Word, The Story of Communication, 1959 
Ships and Life Afloat: From Galley to Turbine, 1953 
Ships of the Great Lakes, 1956 
The Spanish Armada, 1962 - TruthQuest 
The Spanish Conquistadores in North America, 1962 - TruthQuest 
Storm Warning, 1972 
The Story of Locks, 1953 
Story of the Wheel, 1960 
Strange Craft, 1963 
Through the Locks: Canals Today and Yesterday, 1954 
Timber! Farming Our Forests, 1960 
Treasure: The Story of Money and Its Safeguarding, 1955 
Trucks and Trucking, 1957 
Underground Riches, The Story of Mining, 1958 
The Viking Explorers, 1968 - TruthQuest 
Volcano!, 1962 
Warriors Weapons (adult), 1963 
Water, Our Vital Need, 1967 
Westward with American Explorers, 1963 - TruthQuest 
When Towns Had Walls, Life in a Medieval English Town, 1970 
Wonder Worker, The Story of Electricity, 1961 
World Beneath the Waves, 1964 
The World of Marco Polo, 1961 - TruthQuest 
Books Illustrated by Walter Buehr: 
Adventures on the Cloud 9, by Adelaide Field 
The First Book of the Ocean, by Sam & Beryl Epstein 
Mary, Queen of Scots, by Emily Hahn (Landmark series) - TruthQuest 
Moon Base, by William Nephew

See also
Decorative Impressionism
French Impressionism
American Impressionism
California Plein-Air Painting
Richard E. Miller
Theodore Lukits
Christian von Schenidau
List of German painters

External links
 Buehr family papers at the Smithsonian Archives of American Art
Catalog Karl Albert Buehr, Richard Norton Gallery, LLC, 2002.
http://richardnortongallery.com/artists/karl-albert-buehr

1866 births
1952 deaths
19th-century German painters
19th-century German male artists
German male painters
20th-century German painters
20th-century German male artists
School of the Art Institute of Chicago alumni